Dougherty Township is one of sixteen townships in Cerro Gordo County, Iowa, USA.  As of the 2000 census, its population was 275.

History
Dougherty Township was named for Daniel Dougherty, an early prominent resident.

Geography
According to the USGS, it contains one cemetery, Saint Patricks Catholic.

References

External links
 US-Counties.com
 City-Data.com

Townships in Cerro Gordo County, Iowa
Mason City, Iowa micropolitan area
Townships in Iowa